Hammam of Prince Miloš is the former Turkish bath in Belgrade, the capital of Serbia. Built in 1836-37, it was declared a cultural monument in 1948.

Location 

The building is located in the modern Park Gavrilo Princip, until 2017 known as the Financial Park. It is situated just north of the building of the Government of Serbia, west of the building of the Finance Ministry and south of the Ascencion Church.

History 

Hammam of Prince Miloš was built in 1836-37. It was projected as the bath of the princely Lower Court and was part of the court complex along the Topčider Road, designed for the prince's sons Milan and Mihailo Obrenović. The court's garden evolved into the modern park. The court buildings were later handed over to the Finance Ministry and the bath is today the only surviving part of the entire complex. It was declared a cultural monument on 20 April 1948.

In January 2021 it was announced that the object will be returned under the city authority. Reconstruction of the hammam and its adaptation into the cultural center was planned. Also announced was demolition of the building at 14 Admirala Geprata, which separated the bath from the street. New planned building will have "transparent" ground floor, which would allow view on the bath, which is not visible from any of the surrounding streets due to its location in the park and center of the block.

Architecture 

It is believed that the author of the bath was Hadži Nikola Živković, a royal architect during the first reign of Prince Miloš (1817-39), who constructed all royal buildings in the period, like Princess Ljubica's Residence (in Kosančićev Venac) and Residence of Prince Miloš (in Topčider). The concept is a typical Turkish bath design of the period. It is a ground-level building with the hearth room and a protruding chimney. The building is conceived as an autonomous structure of a rectangular basis. Although the dimensions of the building are not large, it has all the component parts of a hammam - šadrvan (fountain), kapaluk (cloakroom), halvat (large private room), hazna (attendant's room) and ćulhan (boiler room). The main room, which was used for bathing and rest, is vaulted with a shallow dome, constructed by the concentric placing of bricks. A particular detail of the dome and the vaults are the lighting openings, covered by glass bubbles.

See more 

 List of cultural properties on Savski venac
 List of cultural monuments in Belgrade

References

External links 

 Savski venac/ Cultural heritage
 Republic Institute for the Protection of Cultural Monuments – Belgrade
 List of monuments
 Republic Institute for the Protection of Cultural Monuments-Belgrade/Immovable cultural property base

Cultural monuments of Serbia
Buildings and structures in Belgrade
Buildings and structures completed in 1837
Savski Venac